Raymond Edwards may refer to:
Raymond Clare Edwards (1920–2017), politician in Ontario, Canada
Raymond Edwards (1922–1997), bass player for The Silhouettes
Raymond Edwards (game designer), see Spiel des Jahres
Raymond Edwards (swimmer), represented Barbados at the 2010 Commonwealth Games

See also
Ray Edwards (disambiguation)